Cooke House may refer to:

in the United States

Andrew B. Cooke House, Virginia Beach, Virginia, designed by Frank Lloyd Wright.
Wm. L. Cooke House, Columbus, GA, listed on the NRHP in Georgia
Charles Montague Cooke Jr. House and Kūkaʻōʻō Heiau, Honolulu, HI, listed on the NRHP in Hawaii
Clarence H. Cooke House, Honolulu, HI, listed on the NRHP in Hawaii
E. V. Cooke House, Jerome, ID, listed on the NRHP in Idaho
Peyton Cooke House, Oakland, KY, listed on the NRHP in Kentucky
Frederick William Cooke Residence, Paterson, NJ, listed on the NRHP in New Jersey
Noah Cooke House, Keene, NH, listed on the NRHP in New Hampshire
Cooke House (Louisburg, North Carolina), listed on the NRHP in North Carolina
Jay Cooke House, Gibraltar Island, OH, listed on the NRHP in Ohio
Cooke–Robertson House, Sandusky, OH, listed on the NRHP in Ohio
Eleutheros Cooke House (disambiguation), multiple places in Ohio
Amos Cooke House, Scituate, RI, listed on the NRHP in Rhode Island
Cooke–Kefauver House, Madisonville, TN, listed on the NRHP in Tennessee